Franken is a Dutch patronymic surname, meaning "son of Frank". Notable people with the surname include:

Al Franken (born 1951), American politician, satirist, writer, and comedian 
Bernard Franken (1914–2001), Dutch racing cyclist
Björn Franken (born 1983), Dutch record producer, songwriter, and DJ known as Vato Gonzalez
Bob Franken (born 1941), American journalist
Bram Franken (born 2001), Dutch footballer
Charlotte Franken (1894–1969), British feminist author
Christian Franken / Francken ( 1550–1610), German Jesuit and later Unitarian
Giovanni Franken (born 1977), Dutch footballer
Henk Franken (born 1987), Namibian rugby player
Henry Franken (born 1966), Dutch engineer and enterprise architect 
Lex Franken (born 1916), Dutch water polo player
Mannus Franken (1899–1953), Dutch filmmaker
Marianne Franken (1844–1945), Dutch painter
Max Franken ( 1980s), Dutch rock drummer
Michael Franken (born 1957), U.S. Navy vice admiral and politician
Paul Franken (1894–1944), German Socialist politician
Peter Franken (1928–1999), American physicist
 (1941–1983), Dutch jazz pianist and organist
Rose Franken (1895–1988), American author and playwright
Steve Franken (1932–2012), American actor
Tony Franken (born 1965), Australian soccer goalkeeper
 (1948–1996), American fashion model
Wilhelm Franken (1914–1945), German U-boat commander
Wim Franken (1922–2012), Dutch composer, pianist, and carillonneur

See also
Franken (disambiguation), for other meanings
Francken (surname), variant spelling of the same surname
Franke, German surname

Dutch-language surnames
Patronymic surnames

fr:Franken (homonymie)